

Events

Pre-1600
27 BC – Gaius Julius Caesar Octavianus is granted the title Augustus by the Roman Senate, marking the beginning of the Roman Empire.
 378 – General Siyaj K'ak' conquers Tikal, enlarging the domain of King Spearthrower Owl of Teotihuacán.
 550 – Gothic War: The Ostrogoths, under King Totila, conquer Rome after a long siege, by bribing the Isaurian garrison.
 929 – Emir Abd-ar-Rahman III establishes the Caliphate of Córdoba.
1120 – Crusades: The Council of Nablus is held, establishing the earliest surviving written laws of the Crusader Kingdom of Jerusalem.
1362 – Saint Marcellus's flood kills at least 25,000 people on the shores of the North Sea.
1537 – Bigod's Rebellion, an armed insurrection attempting to resist the English Reformation, begins.
1547 – Grand Duke Ivan IV of Muscovy becomes the first Tsar of Russia, replacing the 264-year-old Grand Duchy of Moscow with the Tsardom of Russia.
1556 – Philip II becomes King of Spain.
1572 – Thomas Howard, 4th Duke of Norfolk is tried and found guilty of treason for his part in the Ridolfi plot to restore Catholicism in England.

1601–1900
1605 – The first edition of El ingenioso hidalgo Don Quijote de la Mancha (Book One of Don Quixote) by Miguel de Cervantes is published in Madrid, Spain.
1707 – The Scottish Parliament ratifies the Act of Union, paving the way for the creation of Great Britain.
1757 – Forces of the Maratha Empire defeat a 5,000-strong army of the Durrani Empire in the Battle of Narela.
1780 – American Revolutionary War: Battle of Cape St. Vincent.
1786 – Virginia enacts the Statute for Religious Freedom authored by Thomas Jefferson.
1809 – Peninsular War: The British defeat the French at the Battle of La Coruña.
1847 – Westward expansion of the United States: John C. Frémont is appointed Governor of the new California Territory.
1862 – Hartley Colliery disaster: Two hundred and four men and boys killed in a mining disaster, prompting a change in UK law which henceforth required all collieries to have at least two independent means of escape.
1878 – Russo-Turkish War (1877–78): Battle of Philippopolis: Captain Aleksandr Burago with a squadron of Russian Imperial army dragoons liberates Plovdiv from Ottoman rule.
1883 – The Pendleton Civil Service Reform Act, establishing the United States Civil Service, is enacted by Congress.
1900 – The United States Senate accepts the Anglo-German treaty of 1899 in which the United Kingdom renounces its claims to the Samoan islands.

1901–present
1909 – Ernest Shackleton's expedition finds the magnetic South Pole.
1919 – Nebraska becomes the 36th state to approve the Eighteenth Amendment to the United States Constitution. With the necessary three-quarters of the states approving the amendment, Prohibition is constitutionally mandated in the United States one year later.
1920 – The League of Nations holds its first council meeting in Paris, France.
1921 – The Marxist Left in Slovakia and the Transcarpathian Ukraine holds its founding congress in Ľubochňa.
1942 – The Holocaust: Nazi Germany begins deporting Jews from the Łódź Ghetto to Chełmno extermination camp. 
  1942 – Crash of TWA Flight 3, killing all 22 aboard, including film star Carole Lombard.
1945 – World War II: Adolf Hitler moves into his underground bunker, the so-called Führerbunker.
1959 – Austral Líneas Aéreas Flight 205 crashes into the Atlantic Ocean near Astor Piazzolla International Airport in Mar del Plata, Argentina, killing 51.
1969 – Czech student Jan Palach commits suicide by self-immolation in Prague, Czechoslovakia, in protest against the Soviets' crushing of the Prague Spring the year before.
  1969 – Space Race: Soviet spacecraft Soyuz 4 and Soyuz 5 perform the first-ever docking of manned spacecraft in orbit, the first-ever transfer of crew from one space vehicle to another, and the only time such a transfer was accomplished with a space walk.
1979 – Iranian Revolution: The last Iranian Shah flees Iran with his family for good and relocates to Egypt.
1983 – Turkish Airlines Flight 158 crashes at Ankara Esenboğa Airport in Ankara, Turkey, killing 47 and injuring 20.
1991 – Coalition Forces go to war with Iraq, beginning the Gulf War.
1992 – El Salvador officials and rebel leaders sign the Chapultepec Peace Accords in Mexico City, Mexico ending the 12-year Salvadoran Civil War that claimed at least 75,000 lives.
1995 – An avalanche hits the Icelandic village Súðavík, destroying 25 homes and burying 26 people, 14 of whom died.
2001 – Second Congo War: Congolese President Laurent-Désiré Kabila is assassinated by one of his own bodyguards in Kinshasa.
  2001 – US President Bill Clinton awards former President Theodore Roosevelt a posthumous Medal of Honor for his service in the Spanish–American War.
2002 – War in Afghanistan: The UN Security Council unanimously establishes an arms embargo and the freezing of assets of Osama bin Laden, al-Qaeda, and the remaining members of the Taliban.
2003 – The Space Shuttle Columbia takes off for mission STS-107 which would be its final one. Columbia disintegrated 16 days later on re-entry.
2006 – Ellen Johnson Sirleaf is sworn in as Liberia's new president. She becomes Africa's first female elected head of state.
2011 – Syrian civil war: The Movement for a Democratic Society (TEV-DEM) is established with the stated goal of re-organizing Syria along the lines of democratic confederalism.
2012 – The Mali War begins when Tuareg militias start fighting the Malian government for independence.
2016 – Thirty-three out of 126 freed hostages are injured and 23 killed in terrorist attacks in Ouagadougou, Burkina Faso on a hotel and a nearby restaurant.
2018 – Myanmar police open fire on a group of ethnic Rakhine protesters, killing seven and wounding twelve.
2020 – The first impeachment of Donald Trump formally moves into its trial phase in the United States Senate.
  2020 – The United States Senate ratifies the United States–Mexico–Canada Agreement as a replacement for NAFTA.

Births

Pre-1600
 972 – Sheng Zong, emperor of the Liao Dynasty (d. 1031)
1093 – Isaac Komnenos, son of Byzantine emperor Alexios I Komnenos (d. 1152)
1245 – Edmund Crouchback, English politician, Lord Warden of the Cinque Ports (d. 1296)
1362 – Robert de Vere, duke of Ireland (d. 1392)
1409 – René of Anjou, king of Naples (d. 1480)
1477 – Johannes Schöner, German astronomer and cartographer (d. 1547)
1501 – Anthony Denny, confidant of Henry VIII of England (d. 1559)
1516 – Bayinnaung, king of Burma (d. 1581)
1558 – Jakobea of Baden, Margravine of Baden by birth, Duchess of Jülich-Cleves-Berg by marriage (d. 1597)

1601–1900
1616 – François de Vendôme, duke of Beaufort (d. 1669)
1626 – Lucas Achtschellinck, Belgian painter and educator (d. 1699)
1630 – Guru Har Rai, Sikh Guru (d. 1661)
1634 – Dorothe Engelbretsdatter, Norwegian author and poet (d. 1716)
1675 – Louis de Rouvroy, duc de Saint-Simon, French soldier and diplomat (d. 1755)
1691 – Peter Scheemakers, Belgian sculptor and educator (d. 1781)
1728 – Niccolò Piccinni, Italian composer and educator (d. 1800)
1749 – Vittorio Alfieri, Italian poet and playwright (d. 1803)
1757 – Richard Goodwin Keats, English admiral and politician, third Commodore-Governor of Newfoundland (d. 1834)
1807 – Charles Henry Davis, American admiral (d. 1877)
1815 – Henry Halleck, American lawyer, general, and scholar (d. 1872)
1821 – John C. Breckinridge, American general and politician, 14th Vice President of the United States (d. 1875)
1834 – Robert R. Hitt, American lawyer and politician, 13th United States Assistant Secretary of State (d. 1906)
1836 – Francis II of the Two Sicilies (d. 1894)
1838 – Franz Brentano, German philosopher and psychologist (d. 1917)
1844 – Ismail Qemali, Albanian civil servant and politician, first Prime Minister of Albania (d. 1919) 
1851 – William Hall-Jones, English-New Zealand politician, 16th Prime Minister of New Zealand (d. 1936)
1853 – Johnston Forbes-Robertson, English actor and manager (d. 1937)
  1853   – Ian Standish Monteith Hamilton, Greek-English general (d. 1947)
  1853   – André Michelin, French businessman, co-founded the Michelin Tyre Company (d. 1931)
1870 – Jüri Jaakson, Estonian businessman and politician, State Elder of Estonia (d. 1942)
1872 – Henri Büsser, French organist, composer, and conductor (d. 1973)
1874 – Robert W. Service, English-Canadian poet and author (d. 1958)
1875 – Leonor Michaelis, German biochemist and physician (d. 1949)
1876 – Claude Buckenham, English cricketer and footballer (d. 1937)
1878 – Harry Carey, American actor, director, producer, and screenwriter (d. 1947)
1880 – Samuel Jones, American high jumper (d. 1954)
1882 – Margaret Wilson, American author (d. 1973)
1885 – Zhou Zuoren, Chinese author and translator (d. 1967)
1888 – Osip Brik, Russian avant garde writer and literary critic (d. 1945)
1892 – Homer Burton Adkins, American chemist (d. 1949)
1893 – Daisy Kennedy, Australian-English violinist (d. 1981)
1894 – Irving Mills, American publisher (d. 1985)
1895 – Evripidis Bakirtzis, Greek soldier and politician (d. 1947)
  1895   – T. M. Sabaratnam, Sri Lankan lawyer and politician (d. 1966)
  1895   – Nat Schachner, American lawyer, chemist, and author (d. 1955)
1897 – Carlos Pellicer, Mexican poet and academic (d. 1977)
1898 – Margaret Booth, American producer and editor (d. 2002)
  1898   – Irving Rapper, American film director and producer (d. 1999)
1900 – Kiku Amino, Japanese author and translator (d. 1978) 
  1900   – Edith Frank, German-Dutch mother of Anne Frank (d. 1945)

1901–present
1901 – Fulgencio Batista, Cuban colonel and politician, ninth President of Cuba (d. 1973)
1902 – Eric Liddell, Scottish runner, rugby player, and missionary (d. 1945)
1903 – William Grover-Williams, English-French racing driver (d. 1945)
1905 – Ernesto Halffter, Spanish composer and conductor (d. 1989)
1906 – Johannes Brenner, Estonian footballer and pilot (d. 1975)
  1906   – Diana Wynyard, English actress (d. 1964)
1907 – Alexander Knox, Canadian-English actor and screenwriter (d. 1995)
  1907   – Paul Nitze, American banker and politician, tenth United States Secretary of the Navy (d. 2004)
1908 – Sammy Crooks, English footballer (d. 1981)
  1908   – Ethel Merman, American actress and singer (d. 1984)
  1908   – Günther Prien, German captain (d. 1941)
1909 – Clement Greenberg, American art critic (d. 1994)
1910 – Dizzy Dean, American baseball player and sportscaster (d. 1974)
1911 – Ivan Barrow, Jamaican cricketer (d. 1979)
  1911   – Eduardo Frei Montalva, Chilean lawyer and politician, 28th President of Chile (d. 1982)
  1911   – Roger Lapébie, French cyclist (d. 1996)
1914 – Roger Wagner, French-American conductor and educator (d. 1992)
1915 – Leslie H. Martinson, American director, producer, and screenwriter (d. 2016)
1916 – Philip Lucock, English-Australian minister and politician (d. 1996)
1917 – Carl Karcher, American businessman, founded Carl's Jr. (d. 2008)
1918 – Nel Benschop, Dutch poet and educator (d. 2005)
  1918   – Allan Ekelund, Swedish director, producer, and production manager (d. 2009)
  1918   – Clem Jones, Australian surveyor and politician, eighth Lord Mayor of Brisbane (d. 2007)
  1918   – Stirling Silliphant, American screenwriter and producer (d. 1996)
1919 – Jerome Horwitz, American chemist and academic (d. 2012)
1920 – Elliott Reid, American actor and screenwriter (d. 2013)
1921 – Francesco Scavullo, American photographer (d. 2004)
1923 – Gene Feist, American director and playwright, co-founded the Roundabout Theatre Company (d. 2014)
  1923   – Anthony Hecht, American poet (d. 2004)
1924 – Katy Jurado, Mexican actress (d. 2002)
1925 – Peter Hirsch, German-English metallurgist and academic
  1925   – James Robinson Risner, American general and pilot (d. 2013)
1928 – William Kennedy, American novelist and journalist
  1928   – Pilar Lorengar, Spanish soprano and actress (d. 1996)
1929 – Stanley Jeyaraja Tambiah, Sri Lankan anthropologist and academic (d. 2014)
1930 – Mary Ann McMorrow, American lawyer and judge (d. 2013)
  1930   – Norman Podhoretz, American journalist and author
  1930   – Paula Tilbrook, English actress (d. 2019)
1931 – John Enderby, English physicist and academic (d. 2021)
  1931   – Robert L. Park, American physicist and academic (d. 2020)
  1931   – Johannes Rau, German journalist and politician, eighth Federal President of Germany (d. 2006)
1932 – Victor Ciocâltea, Romanian chess player (d. 1983)
  1932   – Dian Fossey, American zoologist and anthropologist (d. 1985)
1933 – Susan Sontag, American novelist, essayist, and critic (d. 2004)
1934 – Bob Bogle, American rock guitarist and bass player (d. 2009)
  1934   – Marilyn Horne, American soprano and actress
1935 – A. J. Foyt, American race car driver
  1935   – Udo Lattek, German footballer, manager, and sportscaster (d. 2015)
1936 – Michael White, Scottish actor and producer (d. 2016)
1937 – Luiz Bueno, Brazilian racing driver (d. 2011)
  1937   – Francis George, American cardinal (d. 2015)
1938 – Marina Vaizey, American journalist and critic
1939 – Ralph Gibson, American photographer
1941 – Christine Truman, English tennis player and sportscaster
1942 – René Angélil, Canadian singer and manager (d. 2016)
  1942   – Barbara Lynn, American singer-songwriter and guitarist
1943 – Gavin Bryars, English bassist and composer
  1943   – Brian Ferneyhough, British composer
  1943   – Ronnie Milsap, American singer and pianist
1944 – Dieter Moebius, Swiss-German keyboard player and producer (d. 2015)
  1944   – Jim Stafford, American singer-songwriter and actor
  1944   – Jill Tarter, American astronomer and biologist
  1944   – Judy Baar Topinka, American journalist and politician (d. 2014)
1945 – Wim Suurbier, Dutch footballer and manager (d. 2020)
1946 – Kabir Bedi, Indian actor
  1946   – Katia Ricciarelli, Italian soprano and actress
1947 – Elaine Murphy, Baroness Murphy, English academic and politician
  1947   – Harvey Proctor, English politician
  1947   – Laura Schlessinger, American physiologist, talk show host, and author
1948 – John Carpenter, American director, producer, screenwriter, and composer
  1948   – Ants Laaneots, Estonian general
  1948   – Cliff Thorburn, Canadian snooker player
  1948   – Ruth Reichl, American journalist and critic
1949 – Anne F. Beiler, American businesswoman, founded Auntie Anne's
  1949   – R. F. Foster, Irish historian and academic
  1949   – Andrew Refshauge, Australian physician and politician, 13th Deputy Premier of New South Wales
1950 – Debbie Allen, American actress, dancer, and choreographer
  1950   – Robert Schimmel, American comedian, actor, and producer (d. 2010)
1952 – Fuad II, King of Egypt
  1952   – Piercarlo Ghinzani, Italian racing driver and manager
1953 – Robert Jay Mathews, American militant, founded The Order (d. 1984)
1954 – Wolfgang Schmidt, German discus thrower
  1954   – Vasili Zhupikov, Russian footballer and coach (d. 2015)
1955 – Jerry M. Linenger, American captain, physician, and astronaut
1956 – Wayne Daniel, Barbadian cricketer
  1956   – Martin Jol, Dutch footballer and manager
  1956   – Greedy Smith, Australian singer-songwriter and keyboardist (d. 2019)
1957 – Jurijs Andrejevs, Latvian footballer and manager
  1957   – Ricardo Darín, Argentinian actor, director, and screenwriter
1958 – Anatoli Boukreev, Russian mountaineer and explorer (d. 1997)
  1958   – Lena Ek, Swedish lawyer and politician, ninth Swedish Minister for the Environment
  1958   – Andris Šķēle, Latvian businessman and politician, fourth Prime Minister of Latvia
1959 – Lisa Milroy, Canadian painter and educator
  1959   – Sade, Nigerian-English singer-songwriter and producer
1961 – Kenneth Sivertsen, Norwegian guitarist and composer (d. 2006)
1962 – Joel Fitzgibbon, Australian electrician and politician, 51st Australian Minister of Defence
  1962   – Maxine Jones, American R&B singer–songwriter and actress
1963 – James May, British journalist/co-host of Top Gear
1964 – Gail Graham, Canadian golfer 
1966 – Jack McDowell, American baseball player
1968 – David Chokachi, American actor
  1968   – Rebecca Stead, American author
1969 – Marinus Bester, German footballer
  1969   – Stevie Jackson, Scottish guitarist and songwriter
  1969   – Roy Jones Jr., American boxer
1970 – Ron Villone, American baseball player and coach
1971 – Sergi Bruguera, Spanish tennis player and coach
  1971   – Josh Evans, American film producer, screenwriter and actor
  1971   – Jonathan Mangum, American actor
1972 – Ruben Bagger, Danish footballer
  1972   – Ang Christou, Australian footballer
  1972   – Yuri Alekseevich Drozdov, Russian footballer and manager
  1972   – Ezra Hendrickson, Vincentian footballer and manager
  1972   – Joe Horn, American football player and coach
  1972   – Richard T. Jones, American actor
1974 – Kate Moss, English model and fashion designer
1976 – Viktor Maslov, Russian racing driver
  1976   – Martina Moravcová, Slovak swimmer
1977 – Jeff Foster, American basketball player
1978 – Alfredo Amézaga, Mexican baseball player
1979 – Aaliyah, American singer and actress (d. 2001)
  1979   – Brenden Morrow, Canadian ice hockey player
  1979   – Jason Ward, Canadian ice hockey player
1980 – Lin-Manuel Miranda, American actor, playwright, and composer
  1980   – Albert Pujols, Dominican-American baseball player
1981 – Jamie Lundmark, Canadian ice hockey player
  1981   – Paul Rofe, Australian cricketer
  1981   – Bobby Zamora, English footballer
1982 – Preston, English singer-songwriter 
  1982   – Tuncay, Turkish footballer
1983 – Emanuel Pogatetz, Austrian footballer
  1983   – Andriy Rusol, Ukrainian footballer
1984 – Stephan Lichtsteiner, Swiss footballer
  1984   – Miroslav Radović, Serbian footballer
1985 – Jayde Herrick, Australian cricketer
  1985   – Gintaras Januševičius, Russian-Lithuanian pianist
  1985   – Twins Jonathan and Simon Richter, Danish-Gambian footballers
  1985   – Sidharth Malhotra, Indian actor
  1985   – Joe Flacco, American football player
1986 – Johannes Rahn, German footballer
  1986   – Mark Trumbo, American baseball player
  1986   – Reto Ziegler, Swiss footballer
1987 – Jake Epstein, Canadian actor
  1987   – Charlotte Henshaw, English swimmer
1988 – Nicklas Bendtner, Danish footballer
  1988   – Jorge Torres Nilo, Mexican footballer
1991 – Matt Duchene, Canadian ice hockey player
1993 – Hannes Anier, Estonian footballer
  1993   – Amandine Hesse, French tennis player
1995 – Mikaela Turik, Australian-Canadian cricketer
1996 – Jennie Kim, Korean singer 
1997 – Brendan Donovan, American baseball player
2003 – Adriana Hernández, Mexican rhythmic gymnast

Deaths

Pre-1600
 654 – Gao Jifu, Chinese politician and chancellor (b. 596)
 957 – Abu Bakr Muhammad ibn Ali al-Madhara'i, Tulunid vizier (b. 871)
 970 – Polyeuctus of Constantinople, Byzantine patriarch (b. 956)
1263 – Shinran Shonin, Japanese founder of the Jodo Shinshu branch of Pure Land Buddhism
1289 – Buqa, Mongol minister
1327 – Nikephoros Choumnos, Byzantine monk, scholar, and politician (b. 1250)
1354 – Joanna of Châtillon, duchess of Athens (b. c.1285)
1373 – Humphrey de Bohun, 7th Earl of Hereford (b. 1342)
1391 – Muhammed V of Granada, Nasrid emir (b. 1338)
1400 – John Holland, 1st Duke of Exeter, English politician, Lord Great Chamberlain (b. 1352)
1443 – Erasmo of Narni, Italian mercenary (b. 1370)
1545 – George Spalatin, German priest and reformer (b. 1484)
1547 – Johannes Schöner, German astronomer and cartographer (b. 1477)
1554 – Christiern Pedersen, Danish publisher and scholar (b. 1480)
1585 – Edward Clinton, 1st Earl of Lincoln, English admiral and politician (b. 1512)
1595 – Murad III, Ottoman sultan (b. 1546)

1601–1900
1635 – Mariana de Jesús Torres, Spanish nun and mystic (b. 1563)
1659 – Charles Annibal Fabrot, French lawyer (b. 1580)
1710 – Higashiyama, Japanese emperor (b. 1675)
1711 – Joseph Vaz, Indian-Sri Lankan priest and saint (b. 1651)
1747 – Barthold Heinrich Brockes, German poet and playwright (b. 1680)
1748 – Arnold Drakenborch, Dutch lawyer and scholar (b. 1684)
1750 – Ivan Trubetskoy, Russian field marshal and politician (b. 1667)
1752 – Francis Blomefield, English historian and author (b. 1705)
1794 – Edward Gibbon, English historian and politician (b. 1737)
1809 – John Moore, Scottish general and politician (b. 1761)
1817 – Alexander J. Dallas, Jamaican-American lawyer and politician, sixth United States Secretary of the Treasury (b. 1759)
1834 – Jean Nicolas Pierre Hachette, French mathematician and academic (b. 1769)
1856 – Thaddeus William Harris, American entomologist and botanist (b. 1795)
1864 – Anton Schindler, Austrian secretary and author (b. 1795)
1865 – Edmond François Valentin About, French journalist and author (b. 1828)
1879 – Octave Crémazie, Canadian-French poet and bookseller (b. 1827)
1886 – Amilcare Ponchielli, Italian composer and academic (b. 1834)
1891 – Léo Delibes, French pianist and composer (b. 1836)
1898 – Charles Pelham Villiers, English lawyer and politician (b. 1802)

1901–present
1901 – Jules Barbier, French poet and playwright (b. 1825)
  1901   – Arnold Böcklin, Swiss painter and academic (b. 1827)
  1901   – Hiram Rhodes Revels, American soldier, minister, and politician (b. 1822)
  1901   – Mahadev Govind Ranade, Indian scholar, social reformer, judge and author (b. 1842)
1906 – Marshall Field, American businessman and philanthropist, founded Marshall Field's (b. 1834)
1917 – George Dewey, American admiral (b. 1837)
1919 – Francisco de Paula Rodrigues Alves, Brazilian lawyer and politician, fifth President of Brazil (b. 1848)
1933 – Bekir Sami Kunduh, Turkish politician (b. 1867)
1936 – Albert Fish, American serial killer, rapist and cannibal (b. 1870)
1938 – Sarat Chandra Chattopadhyay Indian author and playwright (b. 1876)
1942 – Prince Arthur, Duke of Connaught and Strathearn (b. 1850)
  1942   – Villem Grünthal-Ridala, Estonian poet and linguist (b. 1885)
  1942   – Carole Lombard, American actress and comedian (b. 1908)
  1942   – Ernst Scheller, German lawyer and politician, Mayor of Marburg (b. 1899)
1957 – Alexander Cambridge, 1st Earl of Athlone, English general and politician, 16th Governor General of Canada (b. 1874)
  1957   – Arturo Toscanini, Italian cellist and conductor (b. 1867)
1959 – Phan Khôi, Vietnamese journalist and author (b. 1887)
1961 – Max Schöne, German swimmer (b. 1880)
1962 – Frank Hurley, Australian photographer, director, producer, and cinematographer (b. 1885)
  1962   – Ivan Meštrović, Croatian sculptor and architect, designed the Monument to the Unknown Hero (b. 1883)
1967 – Robert J. Van de Graaff, American physicist and academic (b. 1901)
1968 – Bob Jones Sr., American evangelist, founded Bob Jones University (b. 1883)
  1968   – Panagiotis Poulitsas, Greek archaeologist and judge (b. 1881)
1969 – Vernon Duke, Russian-American composer and songwriter (b. 1903)
1971 – Philippe Thys, Belgian cyclist (b. 1890)
1972 – Teller Ammons, American soldier and politician, 28th Governor of Colorado (b. 1895)
  1972   – Ross Bagdasarian, Sr., American singer-songwriter, pianist, producer, and actor, created Alvin and the Chipmunks (b. 1919)
1973 – Edgar Sampson, American musician and composer (b. 1907)
1975 – Israel Abramofsky, Russian-American painter (b. 1888)
1978 – A. V. Kulasingham, Sri Lankan journalist, lawyer, and politician (b. 1890)
1981 – Bernard Lee, English actor (b. 1908)
1983 – Virginia Mauret, American musician and dancer
1986 – Herbert W. Armstrong, American evangelist, author, and publisher (b. 1892)
1987 – Bertram Wainer, Australian physician and activist (b. 1928)
1988 – Andrija Artuković, Croatian politician, war criminal, and Porajmos perpetrator, first Minister of Interior of the Independent State of Croatia (b. 1899)
1990 – Lady Eve Balfour, British farmer, educator, and founding figure in the organic movement (b. 1898)
1995 – Eric Mottram, English poet and critic (b. 1924)
1996 – Marcia Davenport, American author and critic (b. 1903)
  1996   – Kaye Webb, English journalist and publisher (b. 1914)
1999 – Jim McClelland, Australian lawyer, jurist, and politician, 12th Minister for Industry and Science (b. 1915)
2000 – Robert R. Wilson, American physicist and academic (b. 1914)
2001 – Auberon Waugh, English author and journalist (b. 1939)
2002 – Robert Hanbury Brown, English astronomer and physicist (b. 1916)
2003 – Richard Wainwright, English politician (b. 1918)
2004 – Kalevi Sorsa, Finnish politician 34th Prime Minister of Finland (b. 1930)
2005 – Marjorie Williams, American journalist and author (b. 1958)
2006 – Stanley Biber, American soldier and physician (b. 1923)
2009 – Joe Erskine, American boxer and runner (b. 1930)
  2009   – John Mortimer, English lawyer and author (b. 1923)
  2009   – Andrew Wyeth, American painter (b. 1917)
2010 – Glen Bell, American businessman, founded Taco Bell (b. 1923)
  2010   – Takumi Shibano, Japanese author and translator (b. 1926)
2012 – Joe Bygraves, Jamaican-English boxer (b. 1931)
  2012   – Jimmy Castor, American singer-songwriter and saxophonist (b. 1940)
  2012   – Sigursteinn Gíslason, Icelandic footballer and manager (b. 1968)
  2012   – Lorna Kesterson, American journalist and politician (b. 1925)
  2012   – Gustav Leonhardt, Dutch pianist, conductor, and musicologist (b. 1928)
2013 – Wayne D. Anderson, American baseball player and coach (b. 1930)
  2013   – André Cassagnes, French technician and toy maker, created the Etch A Sketch (b. 1926)
  2013   – Gussie Moran, American tennis player and sportscaster (b. 1923)
  2013   – Pauline Phillips, American journalist and radio host, created Dear Abby (b. 1918)
  2013   – Glen P. Robinson, American businessman, founded Scientific Atlanta (b. 1923)
2014 – Gary Arlington, American author and illustrator (b. 1938)
  2014   – Ruth Duccini, American actress (b. 1918)
  2014   – Dave Madden, Canadian-American actor (b. 1931)
  2014   – Hiroo Onoda, Japanese lieutenant (b. 1922)
2015 – Miriam Akavia, Polish-Israeli author and translator (b. 1927)
  2015   – Yao Beina, Chinese singer (b. 1981)
2016 – Joannis Avramidis, Greek sculptor (b. 1922)
  2016   – Ted Marchibroda, American football player and coach (b. 1931)
2017 – Eugene Cernan, American captain, pilot, and astronaut (b. 1934)
2018 – Ed Doolan, British radio presenter (b. 1941)
  2018   – Oliver Ivanović, Kosovo Serb politician (b. 1953)
2019 – John C. Bogle, American businessman, investor, and philanthropist (b. 1929)
  2019   – Lorna Doom, American musician (b. 1958)
  2019   – Chris Wilson, Australian musician (b. 1956)
2020 – Christopher Tolkien, British academic and editor (b. 1924)
2021 – Pedro Trebbau, German-born Venezuelan zoologist (b. 1929)
  2021   – Chris Cramer, British journalist (b.1948)
  2021   – Phil Spector, American record producer, songwriter (b. 1939)
2022 – Ibrahim Boubacar Keita, Former Malian President (b. 1945)

Holidays and observances
Christian feast day:
Pope Benjamin (Coptic)
Berard of Carbio
Blaise (Armenian Apostolic)
Fursey
Joseph Vaz
Honoratus of Arles
Pope Marcellus I
Solemnity of Mary, Mother of God (Coptic Church)
Titian of Oderzo
Eve of Saint Anthony observed with ritual bonfires in San Bartolomé de Pinares
January 16 (Eastern Orthodox liturgics)
National Religious Freedom Day (United States)
Teacher's Day (Myanmar)
Teachers' Day (Thailand)

References

External links

 BBC: On This Day
 
 Historical Events on January 16

Days of the year
January